Cora timucua, the  Timucua heart lichen, is a species of lichen collected from 1885 to 1985 in Florida. The Timucua heart lichen was named to honor the Timucua people. The species is now potentially extinct but this is unknown.

Description 
Cora timucua lichens are around 2.5 to 7 cm across and grow on the bark of shrubs (Lyonia ferruginea and Quercus virginiana) in inland scrub and oak-dominated hardwood forests of Florida. C. timucua is a foliose lichen composed of 1–3(–5) semicircular, lobes; each 1–3(–4) cm wide and 1–3 cm long. The lobes are often striped, with some blue-green areas, as well as grey-green, to brown, or yellow regions, bleeding a reddish brown pigment.

References 

timucua
Lichen species
Taxa named by James D. Lawrey
Taxa named by Robert Lücking
Basidiolichens